WERL (950 AM) is a radio station broadcasting a conservative talk radio format. Licensed to Eagle River, Wisconsin, United States.  The station is currently owned by Heartland Comm. License, LLC and features programming from Compass Media Networks, Premiere Networks, and Westwood One.

WERL dropped its longtime Adult Standards format on July 1, 2010, in favor of the current "Freedom Talk" format.

References

External links

ERL
Talk radio stations in the United States
Radio stations established in 1961
1961 establishments in Wisconsin